Tunisians in France are people of Tunisian descent living in France. People of Tunisian origin account for a large sector of the total population in France. Following France's colonial rule in Tunisia from 1881 to 1956, many Tunisians chose to immigrate to France from the 1960s to the present due to France's favorable economic conditions, while others sought to escape Tunisia's unfavorable living conditions. The early 1980s saw a boom of the Tunisian community in France because of adjustments (over 22,000 cases).

Demographics                       
The 2011 census recorded 150,109 Tunisian-born people.

Notable people

See also
 France–Tunisia relations
 Arabs in France
 Berbers in France

References